Khersabad-e Jafari (also Romanized as Khersābād-e Ja‘farī; also known as Āqā Ja‘farī and Khersābād-e Āqā Ja‘far) is a village in Baladarband Rural District, in the Central District of Kermanshah County, Kermanshah Province, Iran. At the 2006 census, its population was 77, in 16 families.

References 

Populated places in Kermanshah County